The 2004 Royal Bank Cup was the 34th Junior "A" 2004 ice hockey National Championship for the Canadian Junior A Hockey League.

The Royal Bank Cup was competed for by the winners of the Doyle Cup, Anavet Cup, Dudley Hewitt Cup, the Fred Page Cup and a host city.

The tournament was hosted by the Grande Prairie Storm in Grande Prairie, Alberta.

The Playoffs

Round Robin

Results
Grande Prairie Storm defeated Kindersley Klippers 5-3
Nepean Raiders defeated Nanaimo Clippers 4-3 in Double Overtime
Grande Prairie Storm defeated Aurora Tigers 4-2
Nepean Raiders defeated Kindersley Klippers 2-1
Aurora Tigers defeated Nanaimo Clippers 4-2
Grande Prairie Storm defeated Nepean Raiders 7-2
Aurora Tigers defeated Kindersley Klippers 5-0
Nanaimo Clippers defeated Grande Prairie Storm 7-2
Aurora Tigers defeated Nepean Raiders 3-1
Kindersley Klippers defeated Nanaimo Clippers 4-2

Semi and Finals

Award
Most Valuable Player: Kevin Dziaduck (Kindersley Klippers)
Top Scorer: Josh Welter (Grande Prairie Storm)
Most Sportsmanlike Player: Grant Clitsome (Nepean Raiders)
Top Goalie: Chris Whitley (Aurora Tigers)
Top Forward: Scott McCulloch (Grande Prairie Storm)
Top Defenceman: Kyle Radke (Grande Prairie Storm)

Roll of League Champions
AJHL: Grande Prairie Storm
BCHL: Nanaimo Clippers
CJHL: Nepean Raiders
MJHL: Selkirk Steelers
MJAHL: Campbellton Tigers
NOJHL: North Bay Skyhawks
OPJHL: Aurora Tigers
QJAAAHL: Valleyfield Braves
SJHL: Kindersley Klippers
SIJHL: Fort William North Stars

See also
Canadian Junior A Hockey League
Royal Bank Cup
Anavet Cup
Doyle Cup
Dudley Hewitt Cup
Fred Page Cup

External links
Royal Bank Cup Website

2004
Sport in Grande Prairie
Royal Bank Cup